Angustassiminea is a genus of gastropods belonging to the family Assimineidae.

Species
The species of this genus are found in Japan and Northern America. The following species are recognised in the genus Angustassiminea:
Angustassiminea andrewsiana 
Angustassiminea californica  (synonym: Assiminea californica (Tryon, 1865))
Angustassiminea castanea 
Angustassiminea infima 
Angustassiminea kyushuensis 
Angustassiminea lucida 
Angustassiminea nitida 
Angustassiminea satumana 
Angustassiminea succinea 
Angustassiminea vulgaris 

Species brought into synonymy
 Angustassiminea yoshidayukioi (Kuroda, 1959): synonym of Assiminea yoshidayukioi Kuroda, 1959

References

External links
 Habe, T. (1943). Supplemental Notes with Corrections on the Japanese Assimineidae. Venus. 13(1-4): 96-106
 Fukuda H. & Ponder W.F. 2003. Australian freshwater assimineids, with a synopsis of the Recent genus-group taxa of the Assimineidae (Mollusca: Caenogastropoda: Rissooidea). Journal of Natural History, 37: 1977-2032

Assimineidae
Gastropod genera